Tripleurospermum tenuifolium is a species of daisy in the family Asteraceae and is in the tribe Anthemideae. It ranges from Austria, Hungary, through southeastern Europe to Turkey, and the Caucasus. Its chromosome count is 2n=28.

References

Anthemideae
Flora of Austria
Flora of Hungary
Flora of Southeastern Europe
Flora of Turkey
Flora of the Caucasus
Plants described in 1888